Nuri Şahin (born January 1, 1980, in Tokat, Turkey) is a Turkish volleyball player. He capped 155 times for the Turkey men's national volleyball team. As of 2012-13 season, Şahin plays for Halkbank Ankara and wears number 5. He studied at Marmara University.

Born on January 1, 1980, in Tokat, Şahin began playing volleyball in primary school. In 1994, he went professional at Eczacıbaşı. He was then a member of Galatasaray, Emlakbank, Arçelik, Fenerbahçe and Arkas Spor Izmir before he transferred in July 2012 to Halkbank Ankara.

Nuri Şahin is married since 2006 and has a son, Alp Toğan Şahin, born in 2011.

He was a member of the Turkey men's national volleyball team, which was the champion at the 2005 Summer Universiade held in İzmir, Turkey. He won the Men's CEV Cup 2012–13 with Halkbank Ankara and was named "Best Receiver" of the tournament.

Sporting achievements

Clubs
 Men's CEV Cup 2012–13 -  Champion with Halkbank Ankara

National championships
 2014/2015  Turkish SuperCup2014, with Halkbank Ankara
 2014/2015  Turkish Cup, with Halkbank Ankara
 2014/2015  Turkish Championship, with Halkbank Ankara

Individual
 Men's CEV Cup 2012–13 "Best Receiver"

National team
 2005 Summer Universiade -

References

External links
 Player profile at arkasspor.com

1980 births
Sportspeople from Tokat
Living people
Turkish men's volleyball players
Eczacıbaşı volleyball players
Galatasaray S.K. (men's volleyball) players
Fenerbahçe volleyballers
Arçelik volleyballers
Arkas Spor volleyball players
Halkbank volleyball players
Marmara University alumni
Emlak Bankası volleyballers
Universiade medalists in volleyball
Universiade gold medalists for Turkey